The 35th Golden Rooster Awards honoring best Chinese language films which presented during 2021–22. The award ceremony was held in Xiamen, Fujian, China, and broadcast by CCTV-6.

Winners and nominees

References 

2022
Golden Rooster